Lithocarpus ovalis is a species of plant in the family Fagaceae. It is endemic to the Philippines.

References

Flora of the Philippines
ovalis
Vulnerable plants
Taxonomy articles created by Polbot
Taxa named by Francisco Manuel Blanco
Taxa named by Alfred Rehder